The Four Sisters of Charity were four American educators. Loyola Ritchie, Rebecca Delone, Felicia Fenwick and Sister Rosaline Brown. The four women rebuilt Detroit's school system, educating 600 children in schools founded in 1844 and 1859. In 1845, they founded St. Vincent's Hospital, the first hospital in Michigan and the Northwest Territory. A second hospital, St. Mary's was constructed in 1850, and the following year the first outpatient clinic in Michigan, and the second in the nation. They also created the Michigan State Retreat for the Insane, the first private psychiatric hospital in Michigan, and The House of Providence, a home for unwed mothers and their children.

References 

Education in Detroit
Educators from Michigan
19th-century American educators